Megachile frontalis is a species of bee in the family Megachilidae. It was described by Johan Christian Fabricius in 1804.

References

Frontalis
Insects described in 1804